Diphleps is a genus of jumping tree bugs in the family Miridae. There are about five described species in Diphleps.

Species
These five species belong to the genus Diphleps:
 Diphleps henryi Hernandez, 1998
 Diphleps maldonadoi T.Henry, 1977
 Diphleps similaris T.Henry, 1977
 Diphleps unica Bergroth, 1924
 Diphleps yenli Santiago-Blay & Poinar, 1993

References

Further reading

 
 
 

Miridae
Articles created by Qbugbot